Masquerade is an American espionage television series that aired on ABC from December 15, 1983, until April 27, 1984.

Synopsis
Considered an amalgam of Mission: Impossible (indeed, Mission: Impossible alumnus William Read Woodfield was the series' executive story consultant) and The Love Boat, the tongue-in-cheek series starred Rod Taylor as Mr. Lavender, the leader of "Operation Masquerade", a top-secret branch of American Intelligence that conducts missions using ordinary civilians, recruited for their anonymity and their specialized skills. Two trained field agents, Casey Collins (Kirstie Alley) and Danny Doyle (Greg Evigan) are assigned to chaperone the amateur spies. This concept was essentially identical to Call to Danger, a series concept that had been attempted with three unsuccessful pilot films in the 1960s and 1970s, the last two starring Mission: Impossible's Peter Graves.

The Love Boat comparison (frequently used in contemporary reviews of this series) stemmed from the show's casting of a different ensemble of well-known actors each week, much as Love Boat populated its episodes. The first act of every episode depicted the recruitment of a new group of agents, which was invariably followed by a briefing by Mr. Lavender aboard his private plane, ending with Lavender saying, stone-faced: "Welcome to Operation Masquerade".

The budget was a reported $750,000 an episode.

The series debuted with a 90-minute pilot film, followed by 12 episodes before the series was cancelled. This was Kirstie Alley's first television series after her debut in Star Trek II: The Wrath of Khan the previous year. Country singer Crystal Gayle performed the theme song.

Ratings were weak, and attempts to improve them by changing the time slot did not work either.

Cast 
Rod Taylor as Lavender
Kirstie Alley as Casey Collins
Greg Evigan as Danny Doyle

Ratings

Episodes

References

External links
 
 
 Masquerade opening theme at YouTube

1983 American television series debuts
1984 American television series endings
American Broadcasting Company original programming
Television series by 20th Century Fox Television
Espionage television series
English-language television shows
American adventure television series
Television series created by Glen A. Larson